Vikadan is a 2003 Indian Tamil romantic thriller film written and directed by Arun Pandian. Harish Raghavendra played the lead role, alongside Arun Pandian, Gayathri Raghuram, Radhika Chaudhari and Uma.

Plot
Rammohan (Harish Raghavendra), after five long years of saying 'no' to getting married, agrees to wed Gowri (Gayathri Raghuram) after seeing her picture. But he gets a shock on his wedding night when Gowri turns out to be the exact opposite of what he has imagined her to be. While he had thought she would be a traditional, homely girl, Gowri turns out to be an ultra-modern gal who even drinks. On the other hand, Kaveri (Uma), who Rammohan hires as his secretary at work, is the kind of woman he wished for as his wife. Meanwhile, Rammohan rubs Selvakumar (Arun Pandian), the new policeman in town, the wrong way and Selvakumar itches for a chance to get back at him. The time comes when Rammohan gets into an accident.

Cast
 Harish Raghavendra as Rammohan
 Arun Pandian as Inspector Selvakumar
 Gayathri Raghuram as Gowri
 Radhika Chaudhari as Mrs. Selvakumar
 Uma as Kaveri
 Nassar
 Rekha
 Vijayan
 Venkat Prabhu as Rammohan's friend

Soundtrack
Music was composed by newcomer Jerome Pushparaj.
"Kumukku" - Mano
"Yaarivalo" - Harish Raghavendra
"Rama Rama" - Anuradha Sriram
"Umaiapdum" - Harish Raghavendra
"Neeya" - Pushpa Sriram

References

2003 films
2000s Tamil-language films